José Ignacio Martínez García (born 7 March 1989), commonly known as Nacho, is a Spanish professional footballer who plays as a left back for CD Tenerife.

Club career

Rayo Vallecano
Born in Madrid, Nacho played lower league and amateur football in his first three years as a senior, representing Fútbol Alcobendas Sport, CA Osasuna B and Getafe CF B. In summer 2012 he signed with another club from Segunda División B, Rayo Vallecano's reserves.

Nacho made his official debut with Rayo's first team on 31 October 2012, playing the full 90 minutes in a 0–1 away loss against UD Las Palmas in the round of 32 of the Copa del Rey. He first appeared in La Liga on 24 November (again as a starter), in a 2–0 home win over RCD Mallorca.

Nacho scored his first goal as a professional on 20 December 2012, netting from 30 metres for his team's second in a 3–0 league victory against Levante UD. On 31 May 2013, after contributing ten matches to his team's top-flight permanence, he was definitely promoted to the main squad with a contract running until June 2015.

Valladolid
On 6 July 2017, after five full seasons with Rayo, Nacho signed a two-year deal with Real Valladolid of Segunda División. He made 22 appearances in his debut campaign (21 starts, play-offs included), in a promotion after a fifth-place finish.

Tenerife
On 13 July 2022, free agent Nacho signed a two-year contract with CD Tenerife in the second level.

References

External links

1989 births
Living people
Footballers from Madrid
Spanish footballers
Association football defenders
La Liga players
Segunda División players
Segunda División B players
Tercera División players
CD Paracuellos Antamira players
CA Osasuna B players
Getafe CF B players
Rayo Vallecano B players
Rayo Vallecano players
Real Valladolid players
CD Tenerife players